Pinkert is a German language occupational surname for a blacksmith which is also to be found among Ashkenazi Jews and may refer to:

Regina Pinkert (1869–1931), Polish opera singer and soprano
Dean A. Pinkert (born 1956), American trade lawyer

See also 
 Pinker
 Pink (surname)

References 

German-language surnames
Yiddish-language surnames